Frank Martin Seward (April 7, 1921 – April 12, 2004) was a pitcher in Major League Baseball. He played for the New York Giants.

References

External links

1921 births
2004 deaths
Major League Baseball pitchers
New York Giants (NL) players
Baseball players from New Jersey
Duke Blue Devils baseball players
People from Pennsauken Township, New Jersey
Sportspeople from Camden County, New Jersey
Hollywood Stars players
Jersey City Giants players
Newport News Builders players
San Francisco Seals (baseball) players
Springfield Rifles players
Sunbury Reds players
Syracuse Chiefs players